Derek Green (born 6 February 1944) is a British racing cyclist. He rode in the 1968 Tour de France.

References

1944 births
Living people
British male cyclists
Place of birth missing (living people)